Eudorus of Alexandria (1st century BC) was an ancient Greek philosopher, and a representative of Middle Platonism. He attempted to reconstruct Plato's philosophy in terms of Pythagoreanism.

He formulated a teleological principle for Platonism, derived from the Theaetetus: "as much as we can, become like God." In this he believed that he had found an apt definition of the common goal of Pythagoras, Socrates, and Plato. His metaphysics and cosmology combined Platonist, Pythagorean and Stoic ideas.

He is mentioned by Alexander of Aphrodisias in his commentary on Aristotle's Metaphysics. This mention has been often taken as a reference to a former commentary by Eudorus on Aristotle's Metaphysics, although Alexander's text does not really say this. The way Aristotle's texts were available to Eudorus is now an open field for research.
Simplicius refers to him as a Peripatetic philosopher, and relates that he had written on the Aristotelian Categories. He was a native of Alexandria, and had, like Aristo of Alexandria, written a work on the Nile.

Notes

Bibliography
 Bonazzi, Mauro, "Eudorus and early Imperial Platonism", in R.W. Sharples-R. Sorabji (eds.), Greek and Roman Philosophy 100 BC-200 AD, London, Bulletin of the Institute of Classical Studies Supplement 2007, Vol. II, pp. 365–378.
 Mazzarelli, Claudio. Raccolta e interpretazione delle testimonianze e dei frammenti del medioplatonico Eudoro di Alessandria, in Rivista di Filosofia Neoscolastica, 77 (1985), pp. 197–209 e 535-555 (Greek text of the extant fragments with Italian translation).

1st-century BC philosophers
Commentators on Aristotle
Middle Platonists
Roman-era Alexandrians
1st-century BC Greek people